"Nothing" is a song co-written and recorded by American country music artist Dwight Yoakam.  It was released in October 1995 as the first single from the album Gone.  The song reached #20 on the Billboard Hot Country Singles & Tracks chart.  The song was written by Yoakam and Kostas.

Chart performance

References

1995 singles
Dwight Yoakam songs
Songs written by Kostas (songwriter)
Songs written by Dwight Yoakam
Reprise Records singles
1995 songs
Song recordings produced by Pete Anderson